Friedrich Sustris (c. 1540, in Padua – 1599, in Munich) was an Italian-Dutch painter, decorator and architect. He was a son of the artist Lambert Sustris, who worked in Italy.

Sustris got his training from his father Lambert in Venice and Padua. From 1563 to 1567 he was trained by Giorgio Vasari in Florence, after he had returned from a stay in Rome in 1560. His first patron was Hans Fugger who ordered the decoration of the Fugger mansion in Venice. He was the son-in-law of Jan Kraeck.
From 1573 onwards Sustris worked for William V, Duke of Bavaria in Landshut before he became chief architect to the Bavarian court with William's accession to the throne in 1579.

Gallery

Chief works

 Decoration and remodelling of Trausnitz Castle in Landshut
 Expansion of the Residenz, Munich
 St. Michael's Church and the Old Academy in Munich

References

External links
 Frederik Sustris on Artnet

Renaissance architects
Architects from Padua
Architects of the Bavarian court
1599 deaths
16th-century Italian painters
Italian male painters
Year of birth unknown
Artists from Padua
Year of birth uncertain